Ephraim ibn al-Za'faran was a Jewish physician who lived in Cairo in the eleventh century. He was renowned for his extensive library of medical and other scientific texts, and at some point was appointed court physician for the Fatimid Caliph Ma'ad al-Mustansir. Ephraim died around 1068 CE.

Medieval Jewish physicians of Egypt
11th-century Egyptian people
11th-century Jews
1068 deaths
Physicians from Cairo
11th-century physicians
Year of birth unknown
Physicians from the Fatimid Caliphate